Bhumi, also known as Bhudevi and Vasundhara, is a Hindu goddess who is the personification of the earth. She is a consort of the god Vishnu. According to Vaishnava tradition, she is the second aspect of Vishnu's consort, Lakshmi, along with the aspects of Sridevi and Niladevi. According to Hindu mythology, Varaha, the third avatar of Vishnu, saved her from the asura Hiranyaksha and later married her, making her one of his consorts. She is regarded as the mother of Narakasura, Mangala, and Sita.

Etymology and iconography 
The name "Bhūmi" is Sanskrit word for "earth". The version "Puhumi" is the equivalent in Old Awadhi. She is known by various names such as Bhuvati, Bhuvani, Bhuvaneshwari, Avni, Prithvi, Varahi, Dharti, Dhaatri, Dharani, Vasudha, Vasundhara, Vaishnavi, Kashyapi, Urvi, Ira, Mahi, Ela, Vasumati, Dhanshika, Vasumati, Hema, and Hiranmaya.

Bhudevi is depicted as seated on a platform that rests on the back of four elephants, representing the four cardinal directions. She is usually portrayed with four arms, holding a pomegranate, a water vessel, a bowl containing healing herbs, and another bowl containing vegetables, respectively. She is also sometimes depicted with two hands, the right hand holding a blue lotus known as Kumuda or Utpala, the night lotus, while the left hand may indicate the pose of Abhayamudra, the fearlessness or the Lolahasta Mudra, which is an aesthetic pose meant to mimic the tail of a horse.

Literature

Padma Purana 
The episode of the devas seeking the assistance of Vishnu's Varaha avatar in rescuing Bhudevi is described in the Padma Purana:

Brahmanda Purana 
Prahlada, the son of Hiranyakashipu, was a devotee of Vishnu. The father did not like the son’s devotion to Vishnu. He punished Prahlada in a number of ways. Once, he threw down Prahlada from the top of a high building. At that moment, Bhudevi appeared there and received him in her arms.

Consort and children 

Bhudevi is the consort of the anthropomorphic Varaha, an avatar of Vishnu. In the Satya Yuga, the demon Hiranyaksha kidnapped her and hid her in the primordial waters, and Vishnu appeared as Varaha to rescue her. Varaha slew the demon and retrieved the Earth from the depths of the ocean, lifting it on his tusks. He restored Bhudevi to her rightful place in the universe, and proceeded to marry her. Mangala, and according to Vaishnava tradition, Narakasura, were the sons of Varaha and Bhumi.

Narakasura was the first born of Bhudevi. There are two stories about Narakasura's birth. In the first one, he was the first son of Bhumi and Varaha. He was born when Bhumi requested Varaha for a son. Narakasura later performed a penance to receive a boon that only his mother would be able to kill him. In the second one, Narakasura's father was Hiranyaksha and was born when Hiranyaksha's horns touched Bhumi. Narakasura is believed to have been the founder of the legendary Bhauma dynasty among the Boro people. 

Sita, the wife of Rama, emerged from the earth, and thus Bhumi is her spiritual mother. The tale goes that there was once a drought in Mithila, the hometown of Sita. Janaka, the future father of Sita, was ploughing the ground. Under his plough, he found a baby girl (Sita). Rain showered upon the earth and Janaka and his wife, Sunaina, decided to adopt the girl. As Sita was born from the earth, she was also known as Bhumija.

Temples of Bhudevi 

 Bhudevi, Vittalapuram, Ongole, Andhra Pradesh
 Bhoomidevi temple chendia-karnataka
 Sri Bhu Sametha -Venkateswaraswamy temple
 Bhu Varaha Swamy temple, Srimushnam 
 Bhu Varahaswamy Temple , Tirumala
 Bhumidevi sametha Sri Uppiliappan Perumal, Thirunageswaram, Tamil Nadu
 Panniyur Sri Varahamurthy Temple, palakkad

The milking of the earth 

One of the most well-recounted legends of Bhumi is her episode with the emperor of the world, Prithu. When Prithu hears that his people are starving because the earth had withdrawn most of her vegetation, he furiously chases her in her form of a cow. She submits, allowing herself to be milked so that living beings could be nourished once more. Attributes such as the courage, valour, knowledge, and the bodily health of the Brahmin sages are stated to have been milked from the earth, and the virtues and the truths that characterise animals may be attributed to her as well:

Satyabhama avatar

After receiving his desired boon, Narakasura grew arrogant and drunk with his power. He started capturing women and forcefully made them his wives. He captured nearly 16,000 women. He wrested control of heaven from Indra and no deity was able to defeat him because of his boon. Narakasura even took the earrings of Indra's mother, Aditi, and gave them to his mother, Bhumi. Bhudevi was requested by the devas to slay her son. She manifested herself upon the earth as Satyabhama, the daughter of Satrajit. Satyabhama married Krishna, and the couple waged war on Narakasura. She finally beheaded the latter with her husband's Sudarshana Chakra, thus fulfilling the prophecy that the asura could only be killed by his mother.

References

External links
 

Earth goddesses
Hindu goddesses
Consorts of Vishnu